Tereapii Maki-Kavana (born 18 January 1963) is a Cook Islands politician and member of the Cook Islands Parliament.  He is a member of the Cook Islands Party.

Maki-Kavana is from Aitutaki and was educated at Vaitau School and Araura College. He worked as a banker for the Post Office, Cook Islands Savings Bank, and Bank of the Cook Islands.

He was first elected to Parliament at the 2018 election. He is a Seventh day Adventist. He was re-elected at the 2022 Cook Islands general election.

References

Living people
1963 births
People from Aitutaki
Members of the Parliament of the Cook Islands
Cook Islands Party politicians